Seducción (English title:Seduction) is a Mexican telenovela produced by Francisco Burillo for Televisa in 1986. It is an original story of Enrique Jarnes, adapted by Marc Rostand and directed by Manolo García.

Maribel Guardia and Manuel Capetillo Jr. starred as protagonists, while Sergio Klainer starred as antagonist.  Sergio Ramos "El Comanche", Leonardo Daniel and  Olivia Collins starred as stellar performances.

Plot
In the beautiful port of Acapulco the story of two completely different families develops. The first one is formed by the widower Santiago and his daughters Marina and Lupita. He is a possessive father limiting his daughters and denying the possibility of fulfillment in life, because of his outdated ideas and believes that women should only live devoted to family, home and children. The two girls suffer from authoritarianism and incomprehension of his father, especially the youngest, Lupita. Her father blames her for the death of her mother because she died at her birth.

The second family, meanwhile, is made by Alejandro and Virginia, who are divorcing because of the assurance that their marriage is not working because of irreconcilable differences. They are the parents of Juan Carlos and Gabriela, intelligent young and focused, who were capable of accepting the separation of their parents, although the latter are somewhat misplaced in life and therefore have not known how to be the best parents and spouses.

Julio is one of the protagonists of the story. He is a troubled young man who since childhood has had a family problem, and has become withdrawn and quiet. His only support is his best friend, Javier who is his antithesis: an outgoing, womanizing playboy. He owns the hotel in Acapulco where the daughters of Santiago work. Julio and Javier go to a party organized by Alejandro on his yacht to celebrate her divorce, along with Isabel and Roxana, the first the love of Julio who hides a scandalous past; and the second the latest conquest of Javier.

Lupita and Marina are invited to the same party by Juan Carlos. Julio and Marina meet and are immediately attracted, but must fight against the opposition of Santiago and Isabel who is not willing to let go of Julio. There is also Benjamin, an unscrupulous gangster who will make your life checkered many characters and cause more conflict to the plot.

Cast 

Maribel Guardia as Marina
Manuel Capetillo Jr. as Julio
Leonardo Daniel as Javier Fuentes
Sergio Ramos "El Comanche" as Santiago
Roxana Saucedo as Guadalupe "Lupita"
Sergio Klainer as Benjamín
Irma Dorantes as Virginia
Rubén Rojo as Alejandro
Ofelia Cano as Gabriela "Gaby"
Servando Manzetti as Juan Carlos
Angélica Chain as Roxana
Olivia Collins as Isabel
Raquel Morell as Mónica
Miguel Priego as Rubén
Manolo García as Arturo
Juan Eduardo as Rafael
Martha Ortiz as Verónica
Miguel Ángel Fuentes as Chaco
Myrrah Saavedra as Adriana
Constantino Costas as Saúl
Miguel Suárez as Alberto
Diana Ferretti as Alicia
Patricia Rivera as Dra. Marcia Robles
Darwin Solano as Torres
Tere Suárez as Betty
Jean Safont as Dr. Gordoa
Oscar Servin as Armenta
Gustavo Ganem as Raúl
Eduardo Borja as Supervisor
Gerardo Murguía
Nerina Ferrer
Nuria Bages
Héctor Sampson as Kung Fu Instructor

Awards

References

External links

1986 telenovelas
Mexican telenovelas
1986 Mexican television series debuts
1986 Mexican television series endings
Spanish-language telenovelas
Television shows set in Acapulco
Televisa telenovelas